Barbara Laage (30 July 1920 – 21 May 1988) was a French film actress who flourished in the 1950s.

After fleeing Paris with her family during the German occupation in World War II, Laage returned to the city after the war and commenced her acting career in the Paris theatre district of Montparnasse.

Her first move to Hollywood was arranged by theatrical agent William Morris, founder of the William Morris Agency. She is one of several Hollywood stars of the era that would frequent the Chateau Marmont. 

She was the first choice for the lead role in the Orson Welles film The Lady from Shanghai, though the part was eventually awarded to Rita Hayworth.

Partial filmography

 Signé illisible (1942)
 B.F.'s Daughter (1948) - Eugenia Taris
 The Red Rose (1951) - Claire Claris - la photographe
 La Putain respectueuse (1952) - Lizzie Mac-Kay - chanteuse entraîneuse
 The Slave (1953) - Anne-Marie 'Fétiche'
 Traviata '53 (1953) - Rita
 Act of Love (1953) - Nina
 Zoé (1954) - Zoé
 Quay of Blondes (1954) - Barbara
 A Parisian in Rome (1954) - Germaine, la Parigina
 Nagana (1955) - Geneviève Larguillière
 The Adventures of Gil Blas (1956) - Antonia Caldera
 Guilty? (1956) - Jaqueline Delbois
 Les Assassins du dimanche (1956) - Simone Simonet
 The Happy Road (1957) - Suzanne Duval
 Action immédiate (1957) - Hiedi Effen
 Deuxième Bureau contre inconnu (1957) - Mariana
 Miss Pigalle (1958) - Yvonne Pigalle
 Un mundo para mí (1959) - Isabelle
 Ce soir on tue (1959) - Nelly
 Orientalische Nächte (1960) - Arlette
 Bombs on Monte Carlo (1960) - Olga
 Le caïd (1960) - Rita
 Ça va être ta fête (1960) - Michèle Laurent
 Paris Blues (1961) (with Paul Newman) - Marie Séoul
 Le captif (1962) - Sylvie Hamelin
 Portuguese Vacation (1963) - Barbara
 The Crime of Aldeia Velha (1964) - Joana
 O Corpo Ardente (1966) - Marcia
 Drôle de jeu (1968) - Mathilde
 Therese and Isabelle (1968) - Thérèse's mother
 Bed and Board (1970) - Monique, la secrétaire
 Défense de savoir (1973) - Mme Christiani
 Projection privée (1973) - Madeleine

References

External links
 

French film actresses
1920 births
1988 deaths
20th-century French actresses